88 on Field is a skyscraper in Durban, KwaZulu-Natal, South Africa.

See also 
 List of tallest buildings in South Africa
 List of tallest buildings in Africa

References

Skyscrapers in Durban
Helmut Jahn buildings